Jarrod McKenzie Haar is a New Zealand organisational psychology academic, are Māori, of Ngati Maniapoto and Ngati Mahuta descent and as of 2019 is a full professor at the Auckland University of Technology. He is a Fellow of the Royal Society Te Apārangi.

Academic career

After a 2002 PhD titled  'Examining work-family practice use and employee attitudes in a New Zealand local government organisation'  at the University of Waikato, Haar moved to the Auckland University of Technology, rising to full professor.

Haar is convener of a Marsden Fund panel.

Haar is a proponent of the Four-day week.

Awards 
In March 2021, Haar was created a Fellow of the Royal Society Te Apārangi, recognising that "his work on families and how to balance job and family demands is not only ground-breaking in a scientific sense, but of such practical importance to New Zealand and globally".

Selected works 
 Haar, Jarrod M., Marcello Russo, Albert Suñe, and Ariane Ollier-Malaterre. "Outcomes of work–life balance on job satisfaction, life satisfaction and mental health: A study across seven cultures." Journal of Vocational Behavior 85, no. 3 (2014): 361–373.
 Roche, Maree, Jarrod M. Haar, and Fred Luthans. "The role of mindfulness and psychological capital on the well-being of leaders." Journal of Occupational Health Psychology 19, no. 4 (2014): 476.
 Haar, Jarrod M., and Chester S. Spell. "Programme knowledge and value of work-family practices and organizational commitment." The International Journal of Human Resource Management 15, no. 6 (2004): 1040–1055.
 Haar, Jarrod M. "Work-family conflict and turnover intention: Exploring the moderation effects." New Zealand Journal of Psychology 33, no. 1 (2004): 35–39.

References

External links
  
 
 

Living people
Year of birth missing (living people)
University of Waikato alumni
Academic staff of the Auckland University of Technology
New Zealand psychologists
Fellows of the Royal Society of New Zealand